There are many idioms of improbability, or adynata, used to denote that a given event is impossible or extremely unlikely to occur.

In English

Events that can never happen 
As a response to an unlikely proposition, "when pigs fly", "when pigs have wings", or simply "pigs might fly".
"When Hell freezes over" and "on a cold day in Hell" are based on the understanding that Hell is eternally an extremely hot place.
The "Twelfth of Never" will never come to pass. A song of the same name was written by Johnny Mathis.
"On Tibb's Eve" refers to the saint's day of a saint who never existed.
"If the sky falls, we shall catch larks" means that it is pointless to worry about things that will never happen.

Events that rarely or might never happen 
"Once in a blue moon" refers to a rare event. In fact, a "blue moon" occurs every two to three years in a year that has 13 full moons instead of the more usual 12. The "blue moon" is the third full moon in a season having four full moons.
"Don't hold your breath" implies that if you hold your breath while waiting for a particular thing to happen, you will die first.
The Cleveland Browns winning the Super Bowl This references the Browns famously not being able to make an appearance in the Big Game since the inception of the modern National Football League.
The Cronulla Sharks winning the NRL premiership This references the Sharks holding the longest drought in Australian professional sports until their maiden victory in the 2016 Grand Final over the Melbourne Storm; the Sharks entered the competition in 1967.
"Few and far between" indicates rarely seen events.

Tasks that are difficult or impossible to perform 
To have "a snowball's chance in Hell".
"Like getting blood from a stone", and "like squeezing water from a stone".
”Like finding a needle in a haystack”

Things that are impossible to find 
"As rare as hen's teeth".
"As rare as rocking-horse poo".

People or things that are of no use 
"As useless as tits on a bull".
"As useless as a one-legged man at an arse-kicking contest".
"As useful as a chocolate teapot".

In other languages

Afrikaans – as die perde horings kry ("when horses grow horns")
Albanian – ne 36 gusht ("on the thirty-sixth of August")
Arabic has a wide range of idioms differing from a region to another. In some Arab countries of the Persian Gulf,  one would say إذا حجت البقرة على قرونها idha  ḥajjit il-bagara `ala gurunha ("when the cow goes on pilgrimage on its horns"). In Egypt, one says في المشمش fil-mishmish ("when the apricots bloom"). Other Arab people, mainly Palestinian, use the expression لما ينور الملح lemma ynawwar il-malḥ, which roughly translates into "when salt glows", which means "never" because salt is not a glowing material.
Breton - Pa nijo ar moc'h ("when pigs fly")
Chinese – 太陽從西邊升起 ("when the sun rises in the West")
Czech – až naprší a uschne meaning "When it rains and dries". Another expression is až opadá listí z dubu ("When the leaves fall from the oak")
Dutch – met , or als Pinksteren en Pasen op één dag vallen ("when Pentecost and Easter are on the same day")
Esperanto – je la tago de Sankta Neniam ("on Saint Never's Day") — a loan-translation from German (see below).
Finnish –  sitten kun lehmät lentävät - when the cows fly. Also jos lehmällä olisi siivet, se lentäisi (if cow had wings, it would fly), implying futile speculations. Also kun lipputanko kukkii ("when flagpole blossoms") and Tuohikuussa Pukin-päivän aikaan ("in Barkember on St. Buck's day", implying an imaginary month and imaginary day). Sometimes also kun Helvetti jäätyy ("when Hell freezes over"), although saying it aloud to someone is considered very rude and hostile.
French – à la Saint-Glinglin (on Saint Glinglin's day). Glinglin is a nonsense rhyme for the French word saint. A couple of other expressions are quand les poules auront des dents ("when hens have teeth") and quand les coqs pondront des œufs ("when roosters lay eggs"). An expression, today falling into disuse, is la semaine des quatre jeudis ("the week of the four Thursdays"), as in "that will happen (or not) during the week of the four Thursdays" (Thursday was the break in the school week).   The expression aux calendes grecques ("to the Greek Calends") was also used for indefinite postponement, derived from the ancient Latin expression (see below). To express logical impossibility: si ma tante en avait, on l'appellerait mon oncle ("if my aunt had any she would be called my uncle"). What she would have is left to the imagination, and it is probably a parallel creation rather than a borrowing to or from Marathi (see below). To express someone's wishful thinking: Il attend que les alouettes lui tombent toutes cuites dans la bouche ("He's waiting for larks to fall into his mouth all cooked").
German – Wenn Schweine fliegen können! is identical with the English saying "when pigs fly", although the older proverb Wenn Schweine Flügel hätten, wäre alles möglich ("if pigs had wings, everything would be possible") is in more common use, often modified on the second part to something impossible, like "if pigs had wings, even your idea might work". Another phrase is Am Sankt-Nimmerleins-Tag ("on St. Never's Day").Wenn Weihnachten und Ostern auf einen Tag fallen! ("when Christmas and Easter are on the same day")
Georgian– როცა ვირი ხეზე ავა ("when the donkey climbs the tree")
Greek – Του Αγίου Ποτέ ("on St. Never's [Day]") is sometimes used, however the profane Του Αγίου Πούτσου ανήμερα ("right on the Day of St. Dick's") is more popular. A common expression used to point out someone's wishful thinking is Αν η γιαγιά μου είχε καρούλια, θα ήταν πατίνι ("If my grandmother had wheels she would be a skateboard").
Hebrew –  כשיצמחו שיערות על כף ידי ("when hair grows on the palm of my hand", a part of the human body where hair never grows). Another is a legal term, referring to the indefinite postponing of a case, "until Elijah comes".
Hindi - The common phrases are (1) सूरज पश्चिम से उगा है ("sun has risen from the west") and (2) बिन मौसम की बरसात ("when it rains when it's not the season to rain"). The second one is also used to denote something unexpected/untimely as much as improbable. 
Hungarian – The two most often used expressions are majd ha piros hó esik ("when red snow falls"), and majd ha cigánygyerekek potyognak az égből ("When gypsy children are streaming from the sky"). There is a third one: majd ha fagy ("When it freezes"), the short version of majd ha a pokol befagy ("When hell freezes over"), which is not used much anymore. A couple of other expressions are holnapután kiskedden  ("on the less holy Tuesday after tomorrow") and soha napján (on the day of never).
Italian – Common idioms are quando gli asini voleranno ("when donkeys will fly"), il 31 febbraio ("the 31st of February"), il giorno di "mai" ed il mese di "poi" ("the "never" day and the "then" month") and, similarly to Latin, alle Calende greche ("to the Greek Kalends"). To imply futile speculations, a common expression is se mia nonna avesse le ruote, sarebbe una carriola ("if my grandma had wheels, she'd be a wheelbarrow").
Latin – ad kalendas graecas ("to the Greek Kalends") signified indefinite postponement, since the Greek calendar had no Calends period; also cum mula peperit = "when a mule foaled".
Japanese - 網の目に風とまらず (ami no me ni kaze tomarazu) Literally meaning "You can't catch wind in a net." Another idiom of improbability is 畑に蛤 (Hata ni hamaguri) which means "finding clams in a field".

Lombard (Milanese dialect) – quand pìssen i òch ("when the geese will piss"), refers to the popular belief that a goose never urinates
Malay – menunggu kucing bertanduk ("to wait until a horned cat walks by")
Malayalam – കാക്ക മലർന്നു പറക്കും (kākka malarnnu paṟakkuṃ), "[the] crow will fly upside down"
Marathi – आत्याबाईं ना मिश्या असत्या तर काका म्हंटले असते (Ãtyābāiḥ nā mishyā asatyā tar kākã mhaṭalā asatā), "if aunt (here: father's sister) grows moustaches she would be called uncle"
Persian – وقت گل نی (vaght e gol e ney), "when the reed plant blossoms"
Piedmontese (Turin dialect) – An unlikely event will occur in the smana dij tre giòbia (the "week with three Thursdays").
Polish – na święty Nigdy ("till St. Never's Day"); zobaczysz... jak świnia niebo ("you'll see [something] like a pig will see the heaven"); prędzej mi kaktus na dłoni wyrośnie ("sooner will a cactus grow on my palm"); (pulling down the lower eyelid of an eye) Jedzie mi tu pociąg? ("Is a train running here on me?").
Portuguese – no dia de São Nunca ("on Saint Never's day"), nem que a vaca tussa ("not even if the cow coughs"), quando os porcos voarem ("when pigs fly") and quando as galinhas tiverem dentes ("when chickens have teeth"). In Brazilian Portuguese, especially in the historical context of WWII, quando cobra fumar ("when a snake smokes"), which has since reversed meaning, given the participation of Brazil in the war.
Romanian – la paștele cailor/la Ispas ("on the horses' Easter/on Ispas"), când o face plopul pere și răchita micșunele ("when poplars would grow pears and willows wallflowers"), la sfântul așteaptă ("on Saint Waits' Day"), and când va zbura porcul ("when pigs fly")
Russian – когда рак на горе свистнет (kogdá rak na goré svístnet), "when the crawfish whistles on the mountain". После дождичка в четверг (posle dojdichka v chetverg), literally "after the rain on Thursday" yet meaning never. Не видать как своих ушей (ne vidat kak svoih ushey), "not to see [something] like your ears".
Serbo-Croatian – кад на врби роди грожђе (kad na vrbi rodi grožđe), "when willow bears grapes". Another variant is кад на врби засврби (kad na vrbi zasvrbi), "when willow get itchy". Note rhyme in vrbi zasvrbi. Мало сутра (malo sutra), literally "a little bit tomorrow", has a similar meaning as "all my eye". 
Seychellois Creole, also known as Kreol or Seselwa (creole spoken in Seychelles) – lannen de mil zanmen is used, which means "year two thousand and never". It is a fairly new expression used mainly among the youth.
Slovene – Ob svetem Nikoli is a wordplay that literally means "on St. Nicholas' feast day". The word nikoli, when stressed on the second syllable, means "never", when stressed on the first it is the locative case of Nikola, i.e. Nicholas
Spanish – cuando las vacas vuelen ("when cows fly") or cuando los chanchos vuelen ("when pigs fly"). Its most common use is in response to an affirmative statement, for example "I saw Mrs. Smith exercising, I swear!" to which the response given would be something like, "Yeah right, and cows fly". Other variations slightly fallen into disuse include cuando las ranas crien pelo ("when frogs grow hair") and cuando San Juan agache el dedo ("when Saint John bends his finger"). The latter is a reference to the common depiction of St. John with one or two extended fingers.
Tagalog – kapag namuti ang uwak, kapag nangitim ang tagak ("when the crow turns white, when the egret turns black"). Note the euphony between the nouns uwak and tagak.
Turkish – balık kavağa çıktığında ("when the fish climbs the poplar tree"). Another one is çıkmaz ayın son Çarşambasında ("at the last Wednesday of the endless month")
Ukrainian – коли рак на горі свисне ("koly rak no hori svysne"), "when the crawfish whistles on the mountain"; or a longer variant коли рак на горі свисне, а риба заспіває (koly rak no hori svysne, a ryba zaspivaye), "when the crawfish whistles on the mountain and fish sings". Another expression is не бачити тобі ... як своїх вух ("you'll never see [something] like you will never see your ears").
Welsh - Traditional idioms meaning "never" are: tan ddydd Sul y pys ("till two Sundays come together") and pan fydd yr Wyddfa’n gaws ("when Snowdon is made of cheese"). More modern additions include pan fydd moch yn hedfan ("when pigs fly"), pan fydd uffern yn rhewi drosodd ("when hell freezes over") and pan fydd 'Dolig yn yr haf, a gwsberis yn y gaeaf ("when Christmas will be in the summer and goosberries in winter"). Rare events meaning "once in a blue moon" include: unwaith yn y pedwar amser ("once in the four seasons") and unwaith yn y pedwar gwynt ("once in the four winds").

See also
Black swan theory, a term developed by Nassim Taleb to label unexpected, rare events

References

Improbability